The delicate-skinned salamander (Ambystoma bombypellum) is an extremely rare species of mole salamander.

Description
The delicate-skinned salamander was first described by herpetologist Edward Harrison Taylor from a holotype found in 1939 near Rancho Guadalupe, 14 km. east of San Martín in the north-western Asunción province in Mexico.  It is until today the only habitat for this species. Introduced predatory fish and habitat destruction due to agriculture lead to a desiccation of the breeding ponds and to a severely decline of the population. It is a small terrestrial species of about 14.2 cm, with a brown dorsal coloration and a lighter underbelly. The head is flattened. Fingers and toes are unwebbed.

References

Mole salamanders
Amphibians described in 1940